Sergio Guzmán Silva (date of birth unknown) is a Mexican Luchador, or  professional wrestler, who has worked for the Mexican professional wrestling promotion Consejo Mundial de Lucha Libre (CMLL) for most of his professional career. Guzmán works under the ring name Tigre Blanco and initially worked as Kid Guzmán but changed identities in 1999. Guzmán’s real name was not a matter of public record until he lost his "Tigre Blanco" mask on September 18, 2009, and announced his real name as a result. Tigre Blanco is Spanish for "White Tiger", a name that is reflected by his mask, designed to look like the head of a white tiger.

Professional wrestling career
Guzmán made his professional wrestling debut on February 2, 1995, under the ring name "Kid Guzmán". Initially Kid Guzmán worked for the Asistencia Asesoría y Administración (AAA), winning the UWA World Welterweight Championship from Super Crazy in 1997. Kid Guzmán held the title for more than a year before losing it back to Super Crazy.

By 1999 Kid Guzmán had signed with Consejo Mundial de Lucha Libre (CMLL) and changed his ring persona. He became an enmascarado (masked wrestler) under the name Tigre Blanco, wearing an outfit and mask patterned after a white tiger. Tigre Blanco made his first pay-per-view appearance on July 18, 1999, as he participated in CMLL's 1999 Ruleta de la Muerte. The match saw Satánico, Zumbido, Valentin Mayo, Virus, and Rencor Latino defeat Tigre Blanco, Starman, Astro Rey, Jr., El Oriental, and Mr. Águila in an elimination match. On December 17, 1999, Tigre Blanco teamed with El Felino to win the second 1999 Tornero Gran Alternativa, defeating Máscara Año 2000 and Sangre Azteca in the first round, Ringo Mendoza and Ricky Marvin in the second round, and Scorpio, Jr. and Fugaz in the finals to win the tournament. On March 17, 2000, the team of Arkangel de la Muerte, Dr. O'Borman, Jr., Último Guerrero, Zumbido, Rencor Latino, Mr. Mexico, Violencia and Rey Bucanero defeated Tigre Blanco, Máscara Mágica, Astro Rey Jr., Starman, Antifaz, Tony Rivera, Safari, and Olímpico in an elimination match as part of CMLL's March 2000 pay-per-view. Tigre Blanco eliminated Doctor O'Borman, Jr. but was himself eliminated by Zumbido. On April 17, 2001, Tigre Blanco defeated Karloff Lagarde, Jr. to win the Mexican National Welterweight Championship. Following his title win, Tigre Blanco teamed with Ricky Marvin and Sicodelico, Jr., losing to Doctor X, Virus and Mr. Mexico on CMLL's 68th Anniversary Show. On December 14, 2001, Tigre Blanco made another PPV appearance, teaming with Volador Jr. and Tony Rivera, in a loss against Venero, Dr. X and Hijo de Pierroth. In 2001 Tigre Blanco once again participated in the annual Torneo Gran Alternativa, teaming with Black Tiger, losing to Black Warrior and Sangre Azteca in the first round. Tigre Blanco held the Mexican National Welterweight title for almost two years, making only one title defense in that time before losing the title to Doctor X on March 11, 2003. In 2005 Tigre Blanco participated in the inaugural Reyes del Aire tournament, eliminating Stuka, Jr. before being eliminated by Alan Stone. In 2006 Blanco was teamed up with Tigre Metalico (Metal Tiger) and rookie Rey Tigre (King Tiger) to form the group Los Tigres del Ring (The Tigers of the ring). The trio worked together throughout 2006 until Rey Tigre was repackaged as Eclipse. The Tigres del Ring officially disbanded in 2007 when Tigre Metalico changed his ring name to Metalico; however Tigre Blanco and Metalico continued teaming, working lower card matches together. On October 18, 2009, Tigre Blanco lost his mask as he was pinned by Pólvora in a 12-man Luchas de Apuestas cage match. After the match he was forced to unmask and announce his real name per lucha libre tradition.

Championships and accomplishments
Asistencia Asesoría y Administración
UWA World Welterweight Championship (1 time)
Consejo Mundial de Lucha Libre
Mexican National Welterweight Championship (1 time)
Torneo Gran Alternativa: 1999 (II) – with El Felino

Luchas de Apuestas record

Footnotes

References

1974 births
Living people
Masked wrestlers
Mexican male professional wrestlers
Professional wrestlers from Mexico City
20th-century professional wrestlers
21st-century professional wrestlers
Mexican National Welterweight Champions
UWA World Welterweight Champions